Hypericum dolabriforme, the straggling St. Johnswort or glade St. John's-wort, is a species of flowering plant in the St. John's wort family Hypericaceae native to the United States.

Description
It is a semi-woody perennial that produces yellow flowers in the summer. It is distinguished from the similar Hypericum sphaerocarpum by having unequal sepals and over one hundred stamens.

Distribution and habitat
Hypericum dolabriforme is native to the Southeastern United States where it is found in calcareous glades. It has a small native range, being found primarily in Kentucky and Tennessee with range extensions into northern Alabama and Georgia and southern Indiana.

References

dolabriforme
Flora of the Southeastern United States
Flora without expected TNC conservation status